Cirque Peak is a  peak located directly west of Dolomite Pass in the Bow River valley of Banff National Park, in the Canadian Rockies of Alberta, Canada.

The mountain forms a cirque, hence the name.

Scrambling Route 
The scrambling route (rated easy) begins just beyond Helen Lake which can be reached by following the Helen Lake/Dolomite Pass trail 6 km from the trail head beside the Icefields Parkway. From the lake, follow the trail into Dolomite Pass and then choose a line up the peak.

Geology
Like other mountains in Banff Park, Cirque Peak is composed of sedimentary rock laid down during the Precambrian to Jurassic periods. Formed in shallow seas, this sedimentary rock was pushed east and over the top of younger rock during the Laramide orogeny.

Climate
Based on the Köppen climate classification, Cirque Peak is located in a subarctic climate with cold, snowy winters, and mild summers.

References 

Two-thousanders of Alberta
Mountains of Banff National Park
Alberta's Rockies